Ovčarević is a Serbian surname, derived from ovčar ("sheepdog"). The Ovčarević were a notable Serbian family in Habsburg service in the 16th century. It may refer to:

Petar Ovčarević (fl. 1521–41), Habsburg Serb commander
Mihailo Ovčarević (fl. 1550–79), Habsburg Serb commander
Dimitrije Ovčarević (fl. 1552–66), Habsburg Serb commander
Jovan Ovčarević (fl. 1557), Habsburg Serb emissary

References
 
 
 

Serbian families
Serbian surnames
Habsburg Serbs